Fedi Arfaoui (born 7 March 1992) is a Tunisian football defender who currently plays for US Monastir.

References

1992 births
Living people
Tunisian footballers
Espérance Sportive de Tunis players
CS Hammam-Lif players
JS Kairouan players
US Ben Guerdane players
CO Médenine players
US Monastir (football) players
Association football defenders
Tunisian Ligue Professionnelle 1 players